The Canadian Board for Respiratory Care (CBRC) was founded in 1989 as a non-profit organization which produces examinations for credentialing for practicing respiratory care.  The Board also has collaborated with other organizations on matters related to respiratory therapy education.

Affiliated groups 
 Canadian Society of Respiratory Therapists
 College and Association of Respiratory Therapists of Alberta
 Manitoba Association of Registered Respiratory Therapists
 College of Respiratory Therapists of Ontario

See also 
 Respiratory therapist

References

Medical associations based in Canada
Respiratory therapy
Pulmonology and respiratory therapy organizations
1989 establishments in Canada